Kelley Jakle is an American actress and singer-songwriter. She played the role of Jessica Smith in the Pitch Perfect series (2012–2017) and appeared on the first and second seasons of The Sing-Off in 2009 and 2010. She is also a member of an Americana duo band, Robin Alice.

Early life
Jakle was born in Carmichael, California.  She was active in music from an early age, performing as part of the Sacramento Children's Chorus, singing The Star-Spangled Banner at sporting events, including a San Francisco 49ers game in 2006, and auditioning for the singing contest American Idol. Jakle began writing music in 2003. 

After graduating from Loretto High School, Jakle attended the University of Southern California, where she majored in communications. In 2007, Jakle joined the USC a cappella group the SoCal VoCals. During her tenure in the SoCal VoCals, the group won the International Championship of Collegiate A Cappella in 2008 and again in 2010.

In 2009, Jakle took part in season one of The Sing-Off, a singing competition televised on NBC, as part of a group called "The SoCals". The SoCals were eliminated in the third episode. In 2010, Jakle again competed on The Sing-Off, this time as part of "The Backbeats". The Backbeats finished the contest in third place.

Career
While attending USC, Jakle joined the band, By the Way as lead vocalist. The band released a self-titled extended play in 2007. During her junior year, Jakle released a solo extended play, Spare Change, featuring a mix of produced and acoustic tracks.

Upon graduating from USC, Jakle began working as an actress in Los Angeles. Her first film role was as Jessica in the 2012 musical comedy Pitch Perfect, with Jakle being chosen as a "ringer" due to her background in a cappella, at the request of vocal producer Deke Sharon. In 2013, Jakle appeared in 42, a biographical film about baseball player Jackie Robinson co-starring Harrison Ford as Branch Rickey, Jakle's great-grandfather. Jakle reprised her role as Jessica in Pitch Perfect 2 in 2015 and Pitch Perfect 3 in 2017.

In 2013, Jakle released several singles, including a cover of "Ain't It Fun" by Paramore.

On July 29, 2016, Jakle originated the role of Marilyn Monroe in Marilyn! The New Musical at the Alex Theatre in Glendale, California.

Personal life
Jakle is the great-granddaughter of Major League Baseball executive Branch Rickey.

Jakle is an ambassador for ReACT, a movement in Montana that encourages teenagers not to smoke.

Filmography

Discography

Extended plays
By the Way (2007)
Spare Change (2008)

Single

References

External links

21st-century American actresses
21st-century American women singers
American women pop singers
American women singer-songwriters
American film actresses
American musical theatre actresses
American stage actresses
American television actresses
Living people
People from Carmichael, California
USC Annenberg School for Communication and Journalism alumni
Singer-songwriters from California
21st-century American singers
Year of birth missing (living people)